Nationality words link to articles with information on the nation's poetry or literature (for instance, Irish or France).

Events

Works published

France 
 Rémy Belleau:
 Odes d'Anacréon, a translation into French
 Petites Inventions
 Pierre de Ronsard, Les Hymnes (see also Hymnes 1555)

Great Britain 
 Anonymous, The Knight of Courtesy and the Fair Lady of Faguell, publication year uncertain, composed in the late 14th century, based on 13th century French works
 Roger Bieston, published anonymously, although the author's name is revealed in an acrostic, The Bayte and Snare of Fortune, probably translated from the French version of an Italian original work
 John Heywood, The Spider and the Flie. A parable of the Spider and the Flie, made by John Heywood, verse allegory the author's most ambitious work but critics and historians have long dismissed it as awful.

Births 
Death years link to the corresponding "[year] in poetry" article:
 March 7 – Guillaume du Vair (died 1621), French writer and poet
 April 27 – François Béroalde de Verville (died 1626), French novelist and poet
 August 10 – Philipp Nicolai (died 1608), German poet and composer
 November 25 – Jacques Du Perron (died 1618), French
 date unknown – Trajano Boccalini (died 1613), Italian satirical poet
 date unknown – Abdul Rahim Khan-I-Khana (died 1627), Indian poet in Mughal Emperor Akbar court

Deaths 
Birth years link to the corresponding "[year] in poetry" article:
 April 18 – Luigi Alamanni sometimes spelled "Luigi Alemanni" (born c. 1495), Italian poet and statesman
 October 21 – Pietro Aretino (born 1492), Italian
 November 14 – Giovanni della Casa (born 1503)
Also:
 Fuzûlî (فضولی) (born c. 1483), Ottoman Empire
 Sebestyén Tinódi Lantos (born 1510), Hungarian lyricist, epic poet, political historian, and minstrel
 Nicholas Udall (born 1510 or in 1505), English playwright, poet, cleric, pederast and schoolmaster
 Thomas Vaux, second Baron Vaux of Harrowden (born 1510), English
 John Wedderburn (born 1505), Scottish religious reformer and poet

See also 

 Poetry
 16th century in poetry

Notes 

16th-century poetry
Poetry